Viktor Stålberg (born 17 January 1986) is a Swedish former professional ice hockey winger. He played in the National Hockey League (NHL) for the Toronto Maple Leafs, Nashville Predators,  New York Rangers, Carolina Hurricanes, Ottawa Senators and Chicago Blackhawks with whom he won the Stanley Cup in 2013.

Playing career

Amateur
During the 2005–06 season, Stålberg played for Frölunda HC in the J20 SuperElit. He led the team in scoring with 33 goals and 31 assists in 48 games during the regular season and playoffs.  After this season, Stålberg was drafted by the Toronto Maple Leafs in the 6th round (161st overall) of the 2006 NHL Entry Draft.

Stålberg joined the University of Vermont, hitting the ice for his freshman season in 2006–07.  He was one of only two freshmen on the team who played in all 39 of the club's games that season.  He finished the season with 7 goals and 8 assists for 15 points.  During the season, he was named Hockey East Rookie of the Week on 13 November 2006, as well as being named to the Hockey East Weekly Honor Roll.  At the end of the season, Stålberg was named to the Hockey East All-Academic Team.

During his sophomore season in 2007–08, Stålberg again played in all 39 games for the Catamounts, scoring 10 goals and adding 13 assists.  During the year, he was named Hockey East Player of the Week three times, and was also named to the Hockey East Weekly Honor Roll three times.  At the end of the season, he was an honorable mention Hockey East All-Star and had earned a spot on the Hockey East All-Academic Team.

During his junior year at Vermont, Stålberg again played in 39 games, scoring 24 goals and adding 22 assists.  His 24 goals ranked fourth in the nation, and he led Vermont in points.  He garnered many individual honors during this season.  He was one of the ten finalists for the Hobey Baker Memorial Award.  He was the first player from the University of Vermont to be a finalist for the award since Martin St. Louis.  He was named the Hockey East Player of the Month for January, and picked up two Hockey East Player of the Week honors. During his Junior year with the University of Vermont he and his teammates made it to the Frozen Four
Stalberg was a finalist for the 2008-09 Hobey Baker award in his final season with the Catamounts. He ranked fifth in the country in goals (24) that year and was first on the team in points (46) on the way to leading the Catamounts to the Frozen Four. He was the fourth player in program history to be named a finalist for the Hobey Baker award along with Kirk McCaskill '83 (1982), Eric Perrin '97 (1996) and Martin St. Louis '97 (1995, 1996, 1997). Stalberg was also named a Division I First-Team All-American in 2008-09

Professional
After his successful junior campaign at the University of Vermont, Stålberg decided to turn pro, signing a two-year entry level contract with the Maple Leafs on 14 April 2009.  Immediately after signing his contract, Stålberg was assigned to the Toronto Marlies of the American Hockey League.  He made his professional debut with the Marlies during the 2008–09 AHL playoffs. On 30 June 2010, Stalberg was traded along with prospects Philippe Paradis and Chris DiDomenico to the Chicago Blackhawks in exchange for Kris Versteeg and Bill Sweatt.

Stålberg recorded his first career hat trick on 10 January 2012 against the Columbus Blue Jackets. Stålberg won the Stanley Cup in 2013 as a member of the Chicago Blackhawks.

On the back of his success in the post-season with the Blackhawks, Stålberg signed a four-year deal worth $12 million with the Nashville Predators on 5 July 2013. In just his second season with the Predators, failing to live up to the expectations of his contract, Stålberg was demoted to AHL affiliate, the Milwaukee Admirals for portions the 2014–15 season. On 30 June 2015, after he was placed on unconditional waivers, Stålberg was bought out from the remaining two-years of his contract with the Predators and released to free agency.

On 1 July 2015, with ambition to reclaim his status in the NHL, Stålberg was signed to a one-year contract with the New York Rangers. Having made the Rangers opening night roster for the 2015–16 season, Stålberg enjoyed early offensive success, securing a role on the checking line. In 75 games with the Rangers, Stålberg contributed with 9 goals and 20 points.

On 1 July 2016, Stålberg left the Rangers as a free agent, agreeing to a one-year deal with the Carolina Hurricanes. In the 2016–17 season, after recording 12 points in 57 contests with the Hurricanes, who were out of playoff contention, Stålberg was traded to the Ottawa Senators in exchange for a 2017 third-round draft choice on 28 February 2017.

On 11 July 2017, Stalberg left the NHL as a free agent and agreed to a two-year contract with EV Zug of the National League (NL). He instantly became an impact player in Switzerland, collecting 22 goals and 50 points in 48 games and in the 2017–18 season. Placing 4th in overall league points, Stalberg also earned selection to the NL Media All-Star Team and named as the NL Media's Best Forward.

In the following 2018–19 season, Stalberg appeared in just 10 games before receiving and accepting an contract offer for the remainder of the year to leave Zug and move to the KHL with Avangard Omsk on 30 October 2018.

On April 26, 2019, Stalberg returned to Switzerland and agreed to a two-year contract through the 2020/21 season with HC Fribourg-Gottéron.

International play
Stålberg was selected to represent Sweden in the 2012 IIHF World Championship. He also represented Sweden at the 2018 Winter Olympics, where he played in four games and registered one goal en route to Sweden placing 5th.

Personal life
Stålberg's parents are Eddy and Maria Stålberg of Lerum, Sweden. He has two younger brothers, Alexander, and Sebastian, who currently plays hockey for Frölunda HC of the Swedish Hockey League (SHL). His favorite athlete is former Toronto Maple Leafs captain Mats Sundin.

Career statistics

Regular season and playoffs

International

Awards and honours

References

External links
 

1986 births
Living people
Atlant Moscow Oblast players
Avangard Omsk players
Carolina Hurricanes players
Chicago Blackhawks players
Frölunda HC players
Milwaukee Admirals players
Nashville Predators players
New York Rangers players
Olympic ice hockey players of Sweden
Ice hockey players at the 2018 Winter Olympics
Ottawa Senators players
Ice hockey people from Gothenburg
Stanley Cup champions
Swedish ice hockey right wingers
Toronto Maple Leafs draft picks
Toronto Maple Leafs players
Toronto Marlies players
Vermont Catamounts men's ice hockey players
EV Zug players
AHCA Division I men's ice hockey All-Americans